Verner may refer to:

 Verner (name), a given name and a surname (including a list of people with the name)
 Verner, Ontario, a town in Canada
 Verner's law, historical sound change in the Proto-Germanic language
 Verner Motor, a Czech aircraft engine manufacturer
Verner JCV 360, a Czech aircraft engine design
Verner VM 133, a Czech aircraft engine design

See also
 Werner (disambiguation)